New York Athletic Club is an American soccer team based in Westchester County, New York, United States. Founded in 2008, the team fields clubs in both the National Premier Soccer League and the Cosmopolitan Soccer League (part of the USASA). The two leagues represent the fourth and fifth tiers of the American soccer pyramid, respectively.

The team plays its home games at the New York Athletic Club at Travers Island, where they have played since 2008. The border between New Rochelle and Pelham Manor runs through the field at Travers Island. Most of the field is located in New Rochelle, but the entire parking lot is located in Pelham Manor. The team's colors are red, white, and blue.

The women's team, a sister club of the organization, plays in the Women's Premier Soccer League.

History
Erik Alves, who won the 2019 CUNYAC championship as the assistant coach of John Jay College, joined N.Y.A.C.S.C. in November 2019.

Players

2013 Roster
Source:

Year-by-year

Head coaches
  Barclay MacKinnon (2008–2016)
 Erik Bagwell (2016–2018) 
 Ridi Dauti (2018–present)

Stadium
 New York Athletic Club; Pelham, New York (2008–present)

See also 
 Soccer in New York City

References

External links
 New York Athletic Club

New York Athletic Club
National Premier Soccer League teams
Athletic
2008 establishments in New York (state)
Association football clubs established in 2008
Soccer clubs in the New York metropolitan area